Peltasta is a genus of moths in the family Gelechiidae.

Species
 Peltasta gershensonae (Emelyanov & Piskunov, 1982)
 Peltasta pseudozonula (Kuznetsov, 1960)
 Peltasta zonula (Gerasimov, 1930)

References

Gelechiini